Excise stamps of Russia are a kind of Russian revenue stamps. They were issued according to the governmental order of the Russian Federation. On 14 April 1994 they adopted resolution number 319 "Introduction of excise stamps in the Russian Federation". Certain goods produced in Russia or imported to the territory of Russia are subject to  excise tax including:
 vodka,
 alcohol,
 wine,
 tobacco and tobacco products.

Selling of goods subject to this law without affixing excise stamps is prohibited in the territory of Russia since 1 January 1995.

The law was amended by later decrees of the Russian Government.

See also

References 

Russia
Excises
Taxation in Russia
Customs services
1994 introductions
Philately of Russia